was a Japanese serial killer, serial rapist, and war criminal who murdered at least 8 people in the Tokyo and Tochigi Prefecture areas between 1932 and 1946. 

Kodaira killed his father-in-law in 1932 and later raped and murdered at least 7 women between 1945 and 1946 by inviting them into forested areas around Tochigi and Tokyo under the guise of giving them food or employment. Kodaira was sentenced to death after being convicted of killing the seven women and executed in 1949. Kodaira is suspected to have killed other people in Japan, and confessed to committing additional crimes in China. However, the exact number of his victims is unknown.

Early life
Yoshio Kodaira was born on 28 January 1905 in Tochigi, Tochigi Prefecture, and suffered from stuttering during his childhood. In 1923, at the age of 18, Kodaira joined the Imperial Japanese Navy and was assigned to a marine regiment stationed in Yokosuka. In 1928, Kodaira was stationed in China and participated in the Jinan incident, where he personally killed six Chinese soldiers. Reportedly, Kodaira raped many women in China and, in one instance at the Taku Forts, stuck a sword into the belly of a pregnant woman.

First murder and trial 
In 1932, Kodaira retired from the military with the rank of sergeant and married shortly after he returned to Japan. However, his wife eventually left him because he had a child by another woman. On 2 July 1932, Kodaira attacked his wife's family in a rage, killing his father-in-law and injuring six others with an iron rod. Kodaira was arrested and sentenced to 15 years imprisonment, but was released on parole in 1940.

Seven murders and trial 
Kodaira is believed to have raped and murdered 10 women in Tochigi and Tokyo between 25 May 1945 and 6 August 1946. Kodaira was living in Tokyo at the time of the Surrender of Japan in August 1945, and used the post-war situation to exploit vulnerable women for his benefit. 

On 25 May 1945, Kodaira raped and killed a 21-year-old after invading a female dormitory at the Navy Clothing Factory where she was working. In June, Kodaira raped and strangled to death a 31-year-old woman near Shin-Tochigi Station, then stole her watch and money. On 12 July, Kodaira invited a 22-year-old woman at Shibuya Station into the woods to work for a farmer, but then murdered her and stole her money. On 15 July, Kodaira invited a 21-year-old woman at Ikebukuro Station to a farmhouse in the woods where she was raped and strangled to death before stealing her money and getas. On 28 September, Kodaira invited a 21-year-old woman at Tokyo Station to the woods where she was raped and strangled to death before stealing her money and clothes. On 29 December, Kodaira invited a 21-year-old woman at Asakusa Station to work for a farmer in a mountain village in Tochigi Prefecture, where Kodaira eventually raped and strangled her to death and stole her money. On 6 August 1946, Kodaira murdered a 17-year-old girl that he had been recruiting for a job since mid-June, visiting her home and meeting her mother. Police searched for Kodaira after the girl's body was discovered on 17 August, when her parents reported his name to the police.

Trial and execution
Kodaira was arrested on 20 August and denied responsibility for three of the murders in court. On 18 June 1947, the district court tried him for seven of his suspected 10 murders. One of the victims was never identified, and after the fifth murder, Kodaira is known to have committed necrophilia with the corpse. The Supreme Court sentenced Kodaira to death on 16 November 1948.

Kodaira was executed on 5 October 1949 at Miyagi Prison in Sendai. On his final day, Kodaira said "I am fortunate to be able to die on such a calm and peaceful day."

Media 
Based on his case, David Peace published the novel Tokyo Year Zero in 2007.

See also 
Nanjing Massacre
Kiyoshi Ōkubo
Sataro Fukiage
List of serial killers by country
List of serial killers by number of victims

References

External links 
Weekend Beat: Tokyo writer returns to the scene of the crime Asahi Shimbun, 22 December 2007
 Yoshio Kodaira serial murders case

1905 births
1949 deaths
20th-century executions by Japan
Executed Japanese serial killers
Imperial Japanese Navy personnel
Japanese murderers of children
Japanese people convicted of murder
Japanese rapists
Japanese war crimes
Male serial killers
Necrophiles
People convicted of murder by Japan
People executed by Japan by hanging
People from Tochigi Prefecture
War criminals